Wuppertal-Oberbarmen station is a station in the city of Wuppertal  in the German state of North Rhine-Westphalia. It was long an important railway junction, connecting to four railway lines. The only remaining lines at the station are the Dortmund–Wuppertal main line and the branch line to Solingen.

History 

The first station building was opened along with the Elberfeld–Dortmund line under the name of Barmen-Rittershausen by the Bergisch-Märkische Railway Company on 9 October 1847. In 1930 it was renamed as Wuppertal-Oberbarmen.

In 1910, the tracks and Rosenau street were moved during the building of a depot at Wuppertal-Langerfeld. During the Second World War the station area and the station building were badly damaged. After a partial demolition by Deutsche Bundesbahn after the Second World War, the station was rebuilt in the 1980s during the establishment of S-Bahn line S8. Today there is a square-shaped commercial building with a newsagent, a bakery shop and a McDonald's branch.

In its heyday there was in addition to the Elberfeld–Dortmund through line, a triangular junction connected to the line to Opladen and Solingen, as well as a connecting line to the Düsseldorf-Derendorf–Dortmund Süd railway and the Wuppertal-Wichlinghausen–Hattingen line.

For a long time, Wuppertal-Oberbarmen was also an important freight terminal. The last freight tracks were removed in 2006, however, and a DIY store was built on the site.

Current operations  

Long-distance passenger trains pass through Wuppertal-Oberbarmen without stopping. However, all regional trains running through Wuppertal stop. The Wupper-Express (RE 4), the Rhein-Münsterland-Express (RE 7) and the Maas-Wupper-Express (RE 13) stop at the station at hourly intervals. Services on S-Bahn lines S8 to/from Mönchengladbach and S 7 to/from Remscheid) stop every twenty minutes on the local platforms. Services on line S 9 and one in three services on line S8 run to/from Hagen every 60 minutes.

Deutsche Bahn classifies the station as category 3.

Wuppertal-Oberbarmen is also a major connecting point between the railway and other public transport services. The Schwebebahn has its eastern terminus here, and there is a bus station, which is served by many of the lines of Wuppertaler Stadtwerke (Wuppertal's operator of public utilities and transport) and Verkehrsgesellschaft Ennepe-Ruhr (the transport company of Ennepe-Ruhr).

Platforms 
Today, there are three platforms with a total of six tracks. Regional trains stop on tracks 2 and 3; they are also used for non-stop operations by long-distance trains. Services on S-Bahn lines S 7, S 8 and S 9 stop on tracks 5 and 6. The other platform tracks are not barrier-free for the disabled.

Interchanges 
The following services stop at the station.

References

Footnotes

Sources
 

Railway stations in Wuppertal
Rhine-Ruhr S-Bahn stations
S7 (Rhine-Ruhr S-Bahn)
S8 (Rhine-Ruhr S-Bahn)
S9 (Rhine-Ruhr S-Bahn)
Railway stations in Germany opened in 1847
1847 establishments in Prussia